Lath is a village under the tehsil of Upleta in the Indian state of Gujarat.

Geography

Lath is located at a distance of 94.05 km from its District Main City Rajkot. It is located at a distance of 308 km from its State Capital Gandhinagar .

History

Lath is an ancient village with no other villages under the village panchayat. The head of the town is known as the Sarpanch and makes all the administrative and judicial decisions under his/her prerogative. The current Sarpanch is a woman. There is a majority of Patel families in this town like Nadpara,Gardhariya, Makwana, Kansagara etc. There is only one Brahmin in the entire village who performs certain religious rites of Hinduism. Mainly the village is known from Lathiya Chudasama, Rajput Families. Many Jain Gujarati families like Lathiya and Karghatda Desai have had their ancestral hometown in this small village. Both of these families have another branch of their family tree emerging from Lathi, Gujarat and Jetpur respectively.

There has been a primary school in this village since the British times. Today, Lath has a primary as well as a secondary school, electricity and Airtel Mobile phone tower available. In this village two banks are available. One is Bank of Baroda and the other is Rajkot District Co-operative Bank. This village has a BSNL telecom office. Many villages near Lath, find it as its primary source for purchasing kariyana (groceries) and machinery parts. Villages near Lath, see it as a good option for school education.

Yet, to the outside world, Lath is so small and remote that it is often referred as "Lath Bhimora". Bhimora is the nearest village to Lath at a distance of 2.883 km.

Schools Nearby Lath

Kanya Taluka School
Bhimora Primary School 
J.M.K.H
Mojira Primary School

References

Villages in Rajkot district